The 2017 U23 World Wrestling Championships were the inaugural edition of the U23 World Wrestling Championships of combined events, and was held from November 21 to 26 in Bydgoszcz, Poland.

Medal table

Team ranking

Medal summary

Men's freestyle

Men's Greco-Roman

Women's freestyle

References

External links 

 Official website
 Wrestling Database

World U23 Wrestling Championships
World Wrestling U23 Championships
World Wrestling U23 Championships
International wrestling competitions hosted by Poland
Sport in Bydgoszcz
World U23 Wrestling Championship
History of Bydgoszcz